Brett King (born Bertell W. King, Jr.; December 29, 1920 – January 14, 1999) was an American actor who performed in films and on television between 1949 and 1967.

Early life and film career
King attended the American Theatre Wing in New York.

He served as a fighter pilot in the United States Army Air Corps during World War II and was awarded the Purple Heart and the Distinguished Flying Cross. According to King's military enlistment records, he had graduated from high school and had worked as a general office clerk prior to joining the army in January 1942, just a month after Japan's attack on Pearl Harbor.

A few years after his discharge from the army, King began acting in feature films in Hollywood, where he was cast in no fewer than 13 films between 1949 and 1954. His first role was as the character Lieutenant Teiss in the World War II film Battleground (1949).

Television career

In 1954, King was cast as Lieutenant Charles B. Gatewood in the episode "Geronimo" of the syndicated series Stories of the Century, starring and narrated by Jim Davis. King also performed in a supporting role as a cavalry trooper in 11 episodes of the syndicated 1958–1959 television series Mackenzie's Raiders, set in the 1870s, with Richard Carlson as the historical Colonel Ranald Mackenzie at Fort Clark in southwestern Texas.

In 1960, he played Cassidy in "The Devil's Due", an episode on another Western anthology series, Death Valley Days.

King performed as well in five episodes of Wagon Train between 1961 and 1963 and in four episodes each of CBS's Gunsmoke, Dick Powell's Zane Grey Theater, NBC's Bat Masterson, and on the contemporary crime drama Dragnet. He appeared twice on The Roy Rogers Show, The Life and Legend of Wyatt Earp, Tombstone Territory, and Johnny Ringo; and once on The Adventures of Kit Carson, Shotgun Slade, Black Saddle, Law of the Plainsman, Lawman, Laramie, The Virginian, and Yancy Derringer, in the latter as the bandit Jesse James in the episode "Outlaw at Liberty".

Other series in which King performed include Alcoa Premiere, Whirlybirds, Rescue 8, Tightrope, Men into Space, Lock-Up, Rescue 8, Harbor Command and Highway Patrol. His last acting appearance was in the role of Major Jackson on ABC's The Green Hornet, in that series' two-part 1967 finale "Invasion from Outer Space."

Filmography

References

External links
 
 
 

1920 births
1999 deaths
Male actors from New York (state)
American male television actors
American male film actors
Male actors from Los Angeles
Recipients of the Distinguished Flying Cross (United States)
United States Army Air Forces pilots of World War II
Deaths from leukemia
Deaths from cancer in Florida
20th-century American male actors
People from Islip (town), New York
20th-century American businesspeople
People from Harbour Island, Bahamas